NTK could refer to:

 Naam Tamilar Katchi, political party in Tamil Nadu, India
 Národní technická knihovna, library in Prague, Czech Republic
 Need to Know (newsletter)
 Newton Toolkit, for the Newton (platform) PDA
 Ngau Tau Kok station, Hong Kong, MTR station code
Nakkilan Tennisklubi, a floorball team located in Nakkila, Finland. (Known as NTK Nakkila), 
Neural tangent kernel, a mathematical tool to describe the training of artificial neural networks